Annah G. Pettee was a state legislator in Colorado from 1927 to 1930.

She, Helen Beatty Noland and Kittie Brighton sponsored a bill to allow physicians to provide information on birth control.

References

Year of birth missing
Year of death missing
Members of the Colorado House of Representatives
Women state legislators in Colorado
20th-century American politicians
20th-century American women politicians